Talbieh Camp (or Talbiyye or Talbiyeh) is one of the 10 officially recognized UNRWA Palestinian refugee camps in Jordan. The refugee camp is also slightly south of the more recently built Queen Alia International Airport.

History
The camp was one of six "emergency" refugee camps built in 1968 to accommodate approximately 5,000 Palestinians displaced from the West Bank and Gaza Strip due to the Six-Day War. When the camp first opened, most of Talbieh's inhabitants were displaced persons as opposed to refugees, and the population consisted of mostly Bedouin. These two demographic factors made Talbieh different from other refugee camps in Jordan. The Red Lion and Sun Society of Iran donated the tents that originally made up the camp, and later installed concrete shelters.

Demographics
As of 2016, UNWRA reported that Talbieh Camp has a population of over 8,000 UNRWA-registered refugees but its actual population may be larger. Even at the upper estimate of its population, it is the smallest Palestinian refugee camp in Jordan in terms of camp population and one of the least developed. The average household size was 5.3 people in 2012. As of 2013, Talbieh Camp was the only Palestinian refugee camp where young men outperformed young women in terms of completing post-secondary education.

Support facilities
The camp has four schools, including a school for boys and a school for girls, both run by UNRWA, as well as a government-run high school for girls. It also has a women's program center, a health center, and a community-based rehabilitation center. Camp volunteers assist in efforts to combat drug abuse in the community.

References

External links
 
 

Palestinian refugee camps in Jordan
1968 establishments in Jordan
Populated places in Amman Governorate